Alan Turnbull may refer to:

 Alan Turnbull, Lord Turnbull, Scottish lawyer
 Alan Turnbull (drummer), Australian drummer
 Alan Turnbull (scientist), British corrosion scientist and engineer